The Ohio Christian School Athletic Association (OCSAA) is a private organization that hosts season-ending tournaments for Ohio's Christian, private, and charter high schools that have joined as members.  All members abide by OCSAA rules and regulations and have to follow a curriculum deemed as "'Christian', 'Private', or 'Charter'".

High school membership structure
The OCSAA is broken into four regions for its high school members.  Current membership is as follows:

Junior high membership structure
The OCSAA is broken into two regions for its junior high school members. Current membership is as follows:

Northern Region

Arlington Christian
Ashland Christian
Celeryville Christian
Central Christian (Kidron)
Christian Community
Crossover Boys Christian Academy
Cornerstone Christian Academy
Emmanuel Christian Academy
Faith Christian Academy
First Baptist (Elyria)
Gilead Christian
Hearts For Jesus
Heritage Christian (Canton)
Jefferson County Christian
Kingsway Christian
Lake Center Christian
Mansfield Christian
Massillon Christian
Medina Christian
Mentor Christian
Monclova
Open Door Christian School
Ramah Junior Academy
ST. Thomas Aquinas
Summit Christian
Temple Christian (Mansfield)
Westside Christian Academy
Wooster Christian

Southern Region
Calvary Christian
Christian Academy Schools
Coshocton Christian
Cristo Rey Columbus
DePaul Cristo Rey
Dominion Academy
East Dayton Christian
East Richland Christian
Genoa Christian Academy
Immaculate Conception Academy
Lebanon Christian
Liberty Christian Academy
Mars Hill Academy
Miami Valley Christian Academy
Milford Christian
New Hope Christian
Ohio Valley Christian
Ross County Christian Academy
Royalmont Academy
Springfield Christian
Temple Christian (Dayton)
Veritas Academy
Wilmington Christian School

Tournaments offered
The following tournaments are being sponsored by the OCSAA for 2013-14:

High school tournaments
Fall Sports
Co-Ed Soccer (11-man)
Girls Volleyball

Winter Sports
Boys Basketball
Girls Basketball

Spring Sports
Baseball
Softball
Track & Field (boys and girls)

Junior high tournaments
Fall Sports
Co-Ed Soccer (11-man)
Girls Volleyball

Winter Sports
Boys Basketball
Girls Basketball

See also
 List of high schools in Ohio
 Ohio High School Athletic Association
 Ohio high school athletic conferences

References

High school sports associations in the United States
High school sports in Ohio
Christian sports organizations